John Stacy Lyons (September 10, 1911 – November 26, 1981) was an American football player. He played college football at Tulsa and professional football in the National Football League (NFL) as a tackle for the Brooklyn Dodgers. He appeared in two NFL games during the 1933 season.

References

1911 births
1981 deaths
Tulsa Golden Hurricane football players
Brooklyn Dodgers (NFL) players
People from Coronado, California
Players of American football from California
Sportspeople from San Diego County, California